Max Becker (May 25, 1888 – July 29, 1960) was a German politician of the Free Democratic Party (FDP) and former member of the German Bundestag.

Life 
Becker was a member of the state parliament in Hesse from 1946 to 1949. He was a member of the Parliamentary Council in 1948/49, where he was secretary and chairman of the Committee on Electoral Law. He was a member of the German Bundestag from its first election in 1949 until his death.

Literature

References

1888 births
1960 deaths
Members of the Bundestag for Hesse
Members of the Bundestag 1957–1961
Members of the Bundestag 1953–1957
Members of the Bundestag 1949–1953
Members of the Bundestag for the Free Democratic Party (Germany)
Members of the Landtag of Hesse
Members of Parlamentarischer Rat